Abdelnasser Ouadah (born 13 September 1975 in Forbach) is a former footballer. Born in France, he represented Algeria at international level.

Career
Ouadah played for Nancy, Épinal, Niort, AC Ajaccio, FC Metz, CS Sedan Ardennes and Montpellier. The 34-year-old midfielder left after six months with LB Châteauroux and joined to FC Istres.

International career
He was originally part of the Algerian 2004 African Nations Cup team who finished second in their group in the first round of competition before being defeated by Morocco in the quarter-finals. However, he left the team after their first group game against Cameroon when the coach decided to bring in Hocine Achiou and leave him on the bench. He was called up to the team on two more occasions but did not reply present to either one of them.

National team statistics

Personal life
His brother, Mohamed, is a soccer trainer in Moselle.

References

External links 
 
 
 

1975 births
Living people
People from Forbach
Algerian footballers
French footballers
Footballers from Grand Est
Algeria international footballers
Montpellier HSC players
AS Nancy Lorraine players
SAS Épinal players
Chamois Niortais F.C. players
AC Ajaccio players
FC Metz players
CS Sedan Ardennes players
Ligue 1 players
Ligue 2 players
French sportspeople of Algerian descent
2004 African Cup of Nations players
Association football defenders
Sportspeople from Moselle (department)